The 1934 Chicago Maroons football team was an American football team that represented the University of Chicago during the 1934 college football season. In their second season under head coach Clark Shaughnessy, the Maroons compiled a 4–4 record, finished in seventh place in the Big Ten Conference, and outscored their opponents by a combined total of 113 to 106.

Schedule

References

Chicago
Chicago Maroons football seasons
Chicago Maroons football